MyInfo is a personal information manager developed by Milenix Software. MyInfo collects, organizes, edit, stores, and retrieves personal-reference information like text documents, web snippets, e-mails, notes, and files from other applications.

Latest major version adds speed improvements, perspectives, updated user interface, multiple attachments per note, multiple sections per notebook and more.

MyInfo uses both hierarchical, and folder-like structures along with tags, categories and other meta-information for organizing its content. It is one of the several PIM applications for Windows to do so.

MyInfo imports data from different third-party applications, most notably AskSam.

The software is used as a free-form personal information manager, personal wiki, outliner, personal knowledge base, game master tool, GTD filing system and others.

Awards
Nominated for Best Business Application by Software Industry Conference for their Shareware Industry Awards in 2003.

References

Further reading

External links
 

1999 software
C++ software
Note-taking software
Outliners
Personal information managers
Portable software
Task management software
Windows-only software